Fatou Dieng may refer to:

Fatou Dieng (athlete) (born 1983), Mauritanian sprint athlete
Fatou Dieng (basketball) (born 1983), Senegalese basketball player